"I Wanna Feel" is the debut single by American-born British producer Secondcity, released in May 2014. It contains an interpolation from "You're Makin' Me High" (1996) by Toni Braxton, sung by Kelli-Leigh Henry-Davila, who has previously provided vocals on "I Got U" by Duke Dumont. Daniel Bedingfield sings the male vocals. The song reached number-one in the United Kingdom, and was certified platinum.

Critical reception
Lewis Corner of Digital Spy gave the song a positive review, stating:

"Drawing upon his heritage, Secondcity's mix of Chicagoan deep house and UK garage beats proves a steadfast blend – but add a subtle Toni Braxton sample and it becomes a chart-topping contender. "I wanna feel your heart and soul inside of me," the interpolated hook – taken from 1996's 'You're Makin' Me High' – earworms over open hats and a slick groove, rubbing its hands together gleefully at the prospect of continual spins this summer. The biggest '90s dance resurgence in over two decades continues to rave, and if this future anthem is anything to go by, Secondcity is poised to become its latest poster boy."

Music video
A music video to accompany the release of "I Wanna Feel" was first released onto YouTube on 25 April 2014 at a total length of three minutes and thirty-one seconds. As of February 2018 it has received over 60 million views.

Track listing

Charts and certifications

Weekly charts

Year-end charts

Certifications

Release history

References

2014 songs
2014 debut singles
UK Singles Chart number-one singles
UK Independent Singles Chart number-one singles
Ministry of Sound singles
Songs written by Babyface (musician)
Songs written by Daniel Bedingfield
Songs written by Toni Braxton
Songs written by Bryce Wilson
Columbia Records singles